Elder Smith Road is an east-west arterial road in northern Adelaide, South Australia, Australia. It opened in 2007 to connect Main North Road to Salisbury Highway, including a new bridge crossing the Gawler railway line and Adelaide–Port Augusta railway line. It lies entirely in or forms the border of the suburb of Mawson Lakes. It extends west past Salisbury Highway to provide access to a housing estate in Mawson Lakes on the south side and an industrial area of Greenfields on the north side. At Main North Road, it connects to the junction where Maxwell Road continues as the border between Para Hills West and Pooraka.

The Mawson Connector Project built Elder Smith Road in two stages, and also the new Mawson Lakes railway station below the bridge over the railway lines.

Intersections
The entire road is in the City of Salisbury local government area.

References

Roads in Adelaide